Tsai Ching-hsiang is a Taiwanese politician and lawyer.

Education
Tsai earned a bachelor of laws degree from Soochow University and a master of laws degree from Chinese Culture University. He later completed an EMBA from National Taiwan University. He is also known by the English name Shawn Tsai.

Career
Tsai served as head prosecutor in Kinmen and Miaoli, before taking office as the prosecutor-general of Keelung. He later led the Department of Prosecutorial Affairs at the Ministry of Justice. In this role, Tsai facilitated the extradition of Gerhard Dieter Rockmann to Germany and Wang You-theng from the United States. In mid-2007, Tsai was named head prosecutor of the Shilin District Prosecutors' Office. After leaving Shilin, Tsai served as lead prosector in Taoyuan and chief secretary of the justice ministry, followed by a stint as principal of the Judges Academy. He was subsequently named to the Supreme Prosecutors’ Office in July 2016. Early the next year, Tsai was appointed director general of the Investigation Bureau. As bureau leader, Tsai investigated environmental damage and was especially known for leading drug busts. Tsai was respected for his high standards, efficiency, and personal leadership style. He was also known for his close relationship with William Lai.

Minister of Justice 

Tsai was appointed Minister of Justice in July 2018, succeeding Chiu Tai-san. Tsai was formally sworn in on 16 July 2018.

On 31 August 2018, Tsai Ching-hsiang ordered the execution of convicted murderer Lee Hung-chi. Lee's death was the first execution carried out by the Tsai Ing-wen administration.

References

Living people
Taiwanese Ministers of Justice
21st-century Taiwanese lawyers
Chinese Culture University alumni
Soochow University (Taiwan) alumni
National Taiwan University alumni
Year of birth missing (living people)